Judith Pintar is a sociologist and author of interactive fiction. She is also a Celtic harp player and a composer of instrumental music.

Professional career

Interactive fiction 

Pintar is the author of CosmoServe, an interactive fiction (IF) that simulates the interface of Compuserve Information Service (CIS), the first major online service provider before and during the early years of the World Wide Web.  The game was written using an early game design system for IF, Adventure Game Toolkit (AGT) developed by Mark Welch and David Malmberg, and won the 5th Annual Softworks AGT game-writing contest in 1991. The following year Shades of Gray: an Adventure in Black and White, a game co-authored by a team of Compuserve Gamer's Forum members, for which Pintar was the principal designer, won the 6th Annual AGT contest in the group category.  Shades of Gray is “generally considered the finest AGT game of all time.” The collaborative authorship of the game is referenced as an example of the kinds of creative possibilities that emerged within the early online IF community.  Both games were published in a book and CD by David Gerrold, Fatal Distractions: 87 Of the Very Best Ways to Get Beaten, Eaten, Maimed, and Mauled on Your PC, (Waite Group, 1994).

Academics 
Pintar received a master's degree in Anthropology and a PhD in Sociology from the University of Illinois at Urbana-Champaign (UIUC) with a concentration in science and technology studies, and an area focus on the former Yugoslavia. She is the author, with psychologist Steven J. Lynn, of Hypnosis: A brief history. Currently she is Teaching Associate Professor and Acting BS/IS Program Director at the UIUC School of Information Sciences, as well as a faculty affiliate at the Illinois Informatics Institute where she teaches the design and programming of Interactive Fiction.

Music and performance 
One of the first musicians signed by the New Age record label Narada Productions in the 1980s, Pintar released three recordings of original music for Celtic harp on their Sona Gaia imprint. Selected compositions were also included on several Narada compilations.  Her recordings are now owned and distributed by Universal Music Group.

Pintar performed internationally during the 1980s as a harp player and storyteller. Her popular non-fiction book, The Halved Soul: Retelling the Myths of Romantic Love, and the liner notes on her albums and CDs, incorporated stories and poetry that were originally performed.

Discography

Solo recordings
Secrets from the Stone (1984) 					
Changes like the Moon (1987)				
At Last the Wind (1990) 	 				
Quiet Conversation (1997)

Compilation appearances
 Sona Gaia Collection (1990), 				
 Faces of the Harp (1997)	 				
 Narada Film and Television Music Sampler (2003)

References

External links
 Judith Pintar Official Site
 Judith Pintar on Spotify
 CosmoServe on ifwiki
 CosmoServe on the Interactive Fiction Database (IFDB)
 CosmoServe Review on Society for the Promotion of Adventure Games (SPAG)
 Shades of Gray on ifwiki
 Shades of Gray on IFDB
 Shades of Gray Review on SPAG

Year of birth missing (living people)
Living people
New-age composers
Narada Productions artists
Electronic literature writers
University of Illinois Urbana-Champaign alumni